Powell is a town in Navarro County, Texas, United States. The population was 136 at the 2010 census.

Demographics

As of the census of 2000, there were 105 people, 38 households, and 31 families residing in the town. The population density was 62.8 people per square mile (24.3/km2). There were 38 housing units at an average density of 22.7 per square mile (8.8/km2). The racial makeup of the town was 88.57% White, 3.81% African American, 6.67% from other races, and 0.95% from two or more races. Hispanic or Latino of any race were 10.48% of the population.

There were 38 households, out of which 36.8% had children under the age of 18 living with them, 65.8% were married couples living together, 10.5% had a female householder with no husband present, and 18.4% were non-families. 15.8% of all households were made up of individuals, and 15.8% had someone living alone who was 65 years of age or older. The average household size was 2.76 and the average family size was 3.06.

In the town, the population was spread out, with 28.6% under the age of 18, 2.9% from 18 to 24, 25.7% from 25 to 44, 21.0% from 45 to 64, and 21.9% who were 65 years of age or older. The median age was 37 years. For every 100 females, there were 90.9 males. For every 100 females age 18 and over, there were 92.3 males.

The median income for a household in the town was $27,083, and the median income for a family was $34,583. Males had a median income of $33,125 versus $16,250 for females. The per capita income for the town was $16,611. There were 10.3% of families and 11.4% of the population living below the poverty line, including no under eighteens and 8.3% of those over 64.

Education
The Town of Powell is served by the Kerens Independent School District.

Geography

Powell is located at  (32.116807, –96.327301).

Climate

Climate is characterized by relatively high temperatures and evenly distributed precipitation throughout the year.  The Köppen Climate Classification subtype for this climate is "Cfa". (Humid subtropical climate).

References

Towns in Navarro County, Texas
Towns in Texas